West India Docks was a railway station in Limehouse, east London, that was opened by the Commercial Railway (later the London and Blackwall Railway) in 1840. As the name implies, the station served the West India Docks, though it was located on the north side of the northernmost of the three docks; the LBR was later extended to a new Millwall Docks station to serve the other two docks.

West India Docks station opened on 6 July 1840. It was closed to passenger service on 4 May 1926, along with the rest of the LBR east of Stepney. The station, including its timber platforms, was demolished in 1931-34 and today no trace of it remains, and the surrounding area has been heavily redeveloped. The station was located at the junction of Garford Street and West India Dock Road, west of the modern-day Aspen Way.  The Docklands Light Railway line between Westferry and West India Quay runs through the station site, although the viaduct it runs on has been completely rebuilt.

References

West India Docks railway station at Subterranea Britannica

Buildings and structures demolished in 1931
Disused railway stations in the London Borough of Tower Hamlets
Former London and Blackwall Railway stations
Railway stations in Great Britain opened in 1840
Railway stations in Great Britain closed in 1926